Nerwik  is a village in the administrative district of Gmina Purda, within Olsztyn County, Warmian-Masurian Voivodeship, in northern Poland. It is located within Warmia.

Nerwik is the birthplace of Polish jurist, publicist and activist  (1887–1952).

References

Nerwik